Liscloon is a small townland and settlement in County Tyrone. It is situated 2 miles from Donemana and 7 miles from Claudy. The area is sparsely populated although around 80 people reside in Liscloon. Altnachree Castle, also known as Liscloon House and Ogilby's Castle, still stands in Liscloon today. It was built in 1860 by William Ogilby.

Liscloon is divided into Liscloon Lower and Liscloon Upper.

References 

Townlands of County Tyrone